Arden Reid (died 12 May 1988) was a Trinidadian cricketer. He played in three first-class matches for Trinidad and Tobago from 1955 to 1971.

See also
 List of Trinidadian representative cricketers

References

External links
 

Year of birth missing
1988 deaths
Trinidad and Tobago cricketers